New Orleans is a 44-storey,  residential skyscraper in Rotterdam, Netherlands, designed by Álvaro Siza Vieira. It is currently the tallest residential building (and second tallest building overall) in the Netherlands. Consist of residential area with swimming pool, saunas and gym for residents as well as commercial area with cinema LantarenVenster

References

External links

Residential buildings completed in 2009
Residential skyscrapers in the Netherlands
Skyscrapers in Rotterdam
Álvaro Siza Vieira buildings